The 2020–21 Texas Longhorns women's basketball team represented the University of Texas at Austin in the 2020-21 NCAA Division I women's basketball season. It was head coach Vic Schaefer's first season at Texas after departing from Mississippi State. The Longhorns were members of the Big 12 Conference and played their home games at the Frank Erwin Center.

Previous season
The Longhorns finished the season 19–11, 11–7 in Big 12 play to finish in third place. Due to the COVID-19 pandemic, there was no post-season play.

Offseason

Departures

Recruits

|-
| colspan="7" style="padding-left:10px;" | Overall recruiting rankings:
|-
| colspan="7" style="font-size:85%; background:#F5F5F5;" | 

|}

Roster

Schedule

|-
|-
!colspan=12 style=| regular season

|-
!colspan=9 style=|Big 12 Women’s Tournament

|-
!colspan=9 style=""|NCAA Women's Tournament

|}

Rankings

^AP & Coaches did not release a Week 1 poll.

2020–21 media

Television and radio information
Most University of Texas home games were shown on the Longhorn Network, with national telecasts on the Big 12 Conference's television partners. On the radio, women's basketball games aired on KTXX-HD4 "105.3 The Bat", with select games on KTXX-FM 104.9.

See also
 2020–21 Texas Longhorns men's basketball team

References

Texas Longhorns women's basketball seasons
Texas
Texas Longhorns
Texas Longhorns
Texas